Frances Eliza Hodgson Burnett (24 November 1849 – 29 October 1924) was a British-American novelist and playwright. She is best known for the three children's novels Little Lord Fauntleroy (published in 1885–1886), A Little Princess (1905), and The Secret Garden (1911).

Frances Eliza Hodgson was born in Cheetham, Manchester, England. After her father died in 1853, when Frances was 4 years old, the family fell on straitened circumstances and in 1865 emigrated to the United States, settling in New Market, Tennessee. Frances began her remunerative writing career there at age 19 to help earn money for the family, publishing stories in magazines. In 1870, her mother died. In Knoxville, Tennessee, in 1873 she married Swan Burnett, who became a medical doctor. Their first son Lionel was born a year later. The Burnetts lived for two years in Paris, where their second son Vivian was born, before returning to the United States to live in Washington, D.C. Burnett then began to write novels, the first of which (That Lass o' Lowrie's), was published to good reviews. Little Lord Fauntleroy was published in 1886 and made her a popular writer of children's fiction, although her romantic adult novels written in the 1890s were also popular. She wrote and helped to produce stage versions of Little Lord Fauntleroy and A Little Princess.

Beginning in the 1880s, Burnett began to travel to England frequently and in the 1890s bought a home there, where she wrote The Secret Garden. Her elder son, Lionel, died of tuberculosis in 1890, which caused a relapse of the depression she had struggled with for much of her life. She divorced Swan Burnett in 1898, married Stephen Townsend in 1900, and divorced him in 1902. A few years later she settled in Nassau County, New York, where she died in 1924 and is buried in Roslyn Cemetery.

In 1936, a memorial sculpture by Bessie Potter Vonnoh was erected in her honor in Central Park's Conservatory Garden. The statue depicts her two famous Secret Garden characters, Mary and Dickon.

Biography

Childhood in Manchester, United Kingdom

Frances Eliza Hodgson was born at 141 York Street in Cheetham, Manchester on 24 November 1849. She was the third of five children of Edwin Hodgson, an ironmonger from Doncaster in Yorkshire, and his wife Eliza Boond, from a well-to-do Manchester family. Hodgson owned a business in Deansgate, selling ironmongery and brass goods. The family lived comfortably, employing a maid and a nurse-maid. Frances had two older brothers and two younger sisters.

In 1852, the family moved about a mile away to a newly built terrace, opposite St Luke's Church, with greater access to outdoor space. Barely a year later, on 1 September 1853 and with his wife pregnant for a fifth time, Hodgson died suddenly of a stroke, leaving the family without an income. Frances was cared for by her grandmother while her mother took over running the family business. From her grandmother, who bought her books, Frances learned to love reading, in particular her first book, The Flower Book, which had colored illustrations and poems. Because of their reduced income, Eliza had to give up their family home and moved with her children to live with relatives in Seedley Grove, Tanners Lane, Pendleton, Salford, where they lived in a house with a large enclosed garden in which Frances enjoyed playing.

For a year Frances went to a small dame school run by two women, where she first saw a book about fairies. When her mother moved the family to Islington Square, Salford, Frances mourned the lack of flowers and gardens. Their new home was located in a gated square of faded gentility adjacent to an area with severe overcrowding and poverty that "defied description", according to Friedrich Engels, who lived in Manchester at the time.

Frances had an active imagination, writing stories she made up in old notebooks. One of her favorite books was Harriet Beecher Stowe's novel Uncle Tom's Cabin, and she spent many hours acting out scenes from the story.  Frances and her siblings were sent to be educated at The Select Seminary for Young Ladies and Gentlemen, where she was described as "precocious" and "romantic". She had an active social life and enjoyed telling stories to her friends and cousins; in her mother, she found a good audience, although her brothers tended to tease her about her stories.

Manchester was almost entirely dependent on a cotton economy that was ruined by the Lancashire cotton famine brought about by the American Civil War. In 1863, Eliza Hodgson was forced to sell their business and move the family once again to an even smaller home; at that time Frances' limited education came to an end. Eliza's brother (Frances's uncle), William Boond, asked the family to join him in Knoxville, Tennessee, where he now had a thriving dry goods store. Within the year Eliza decided to accept his offer and move the family from Manchester.  She sold their possessions and told Frances to burn her early writings in the fire.  In 1865, the family emigrated to the United States and settled near Knoxville.

Move to Tennessee 
After the end of the Civil War and the trade it had brought to the area, Frances's uncle lost much of his business and was unable to provide for the newly arrived family. The family went to live in a log cabin during their first winter in New Market, outside Knoxville. They later moved to a home in Knoxville that Frances called "Noah's Ark, Mt. Ararat", a name inspired by the house's location atop an isolated hill.  Living across from them was the Burnett family, and Frances became friendly with Swan Burnett, to whom she introduced books by authors such as Charles Dickens, Sir Walter Scott and William Makepeace Thackeray that she had read in England. She may have befriended him because of a childhood injury that left him lame and unable to participate in physical activities. Not long after they met, Swan left for college in Ohio.

Frances turned to writing to earn money. Her first story was published in Godey's Lady's Book in 1868. Soon after, she was being published regularly in Godey's Lady's Book, Scribner's Monthly, Peterson's Magazine and Harper's Bazaar. She wanted to escape from the family's poverty and tended to overwork herself, later writing that she had been "a pen driving machine" during the early years of her career. For five years she wrote constantly, often not worrying about the quality of her work. Once her first story was published, before she was 18, she spent the rest of her life as a working writer. By 1869, she had earned enough to move the family into a better home in Knoxville.

Her mother died in 1870, and within two years two of her sisters and a brother were married. Although she remained friends with Swan, neither was in a hurry to be married.

Marriage 
With the income from her writing, she returned to England for an extended visit in 1872, and then went to Paris where, having agreed to marry Swan, she ordered an haute couture wedding dress to be made and shipped to Tennessee. Shortly afterward she returned home and attempted to postpone the wedding until the dress arrived, but Swan insisted they marry as soon as possible, and they were married in September 1873. Writing about the dress disappointment to a Manchester friend, she said of her new husband: "Men are so shallow ... he does not know the vital importance of the difference between white satin and tulle, and cream-colored brocade".  Within the year she gave birth to her first child, Lionel, in September 1874. Also during that year she began work on her first full-length novel, That Lass o' Lowrie's, set in Lancashire.

The couple wanted to leave Knoxville, and her writing income was enough for them to travel to Paris, where Swan continued his medical training as an eye and ear specialist. The birth of their second son, Vivian, forced them to return to the United States. She had wanted her second child to be a girl, and having chosen the name Vivien, changed to the masculine spelling for her new son. The family continued to rely on her writing income and to economize she made clothing for her boys, often including many frills. Later, Burnett continued to make clothing, designing velvet suits with lace collars for her boys, and frilly dresses for herself. She allowed her sons' hair to grow long, which she then shaped into long curls.

Moved to Washington, D.C. 

After two years in Paris, the family intended to move to Washington, D.C., where Swan, now qualified as a doctor, wanted to start his medical practice. However they were in debt, so Frances was forced to live with Swan's parents in New Market while he established himself in D.C. Early in 1877, she was offered a contract to have That Lass o' Lowrie's published, which was doing well in its serialization, and at that point, she made her husband her business manager. That Lass o' Lowrie's was published to good reviews, and the rights were sold for a British edition. Shortly after the publication of the book, she joined her husband in D.C., where she established a household and friends.  She continued to write, becoming known as a rising young novelist. Despite the difficulties of raising a family and settling into a new city, Burnett began work on Haworth's, which was published in 1879, as well as writing a dramatic interpretation of That Lass o' Lowrie's in response to a pirated stage version presented in London. After a visit to Boston in 1879, where she met Louisa May Alcott, and Mary Mapes Dodge, editor of children's magazine St. Nicholas, Burnett began to write children's fiction. For the next five years, she had published several short works in St. Nicholas. Burnett continued to write adult fiction as well: Louisiana was published in 1880; A Fair Barbarian in 1881; and Through One Administration in 1883. She wrote the play Esmerelda in 1881 while staying at the "Logan House" inn near Lake Lure, North Carolina; it became the longest-running play on Broadway in the 19th century.  However, as had happened earlier in Knoxville, she felt the pressure of maintaining a household, caring for children and a husband, and keeping to her writing schedule, which caused exhaustion and depression.

Within a few years Burnett became well known in Washington society and hosted a literary salon on Tuesday evenings, often attended by politicians, as well as local literati. Swan's practice grew and had a good reputation, but his income lagged behind hers, so she believed she had to continue writing. Unfortunately she was often ill and suffered from the heat of D.C., which she escaped whenever possible. In the early 1880s she became interested in Christian Science as well as Spiritualism and Theosophy. These beliefs would affect her later life as well as being incorporated into her later fiction. She was a devoted mother and took great joy in her two sons. She doted on their appearance, continuing the practice of curling their long hair each day, which became the inspiration for Little Lord Fauntleroy.

In 1884, she began work on Little Lord Fauntleroy, with the serialization beginning in 1885 in St. Nicholas, and the publication in book form in 1886. Little Lord Fauntleroy received good reviews, became a best-seller in the United States, and England was translated into 12 languages and secured Burnett's reputation as a writer. The story features a boy who dresses in elaborate velvet suits and wears his long hair in curls. The central character, Cedric, was modeled on Burnett's younger son Vivian, and the autobiographical aspects of Little Lord Fauntleroy occasionally led to disparaging remarks from the press. After the publication of Little Lord Fauntleroy, Burnett's reputation as a writer of children's books was fully established. In 1888 she won a lawsuit in England over the dramatic rights to Little Lord Fauntleroy, establishing a precedent that was incorporated into British copyright law in 1911. In response to a second incident of pirating her material into a dramatic piece, she wrote The Real Little Lord Fauntleroy, which was produced on stage in London and on Broadway. The play went on to make her as much money as the book.

Return to England 
In 1887 Burnett traveled to England for Queen Victoria's Golden Jubilee, which became the first of yearly transatlantic trips from the United States to England. Accompanied by her sons, she visited tourist attractions such as Madame Tussaud's Wax Museum in London. In her rented rooms she continued the Tuesday evening salon and soon attracted visitors, meeting Stephen Townsend for the first time. Despite her busy schedule, she felt ill from the heat and the crowds of tourists, spending protracted periods in bed. With her sons, she moved on to spend the winter in Florence, where she wrote The Fortunes of Philippa Fairfax, the only book to be published in England but not in the United States. That winter Sara Crewe or What Happened at Miss Minchin's was published in the United States. She would go on to make Sara Crewe into a stage play, and later rewrite the story into A Little Princess. In 1888, Burnett returned to Manchester, where she leased a large home off Cromwell Road, had it decorated, and then turned it over to cousins to run as a boarding house, after which she moved to London, where she again took rooms, enjoyed the London season, and prepared Phyllis for production, a stage adaptation of The Fortunes of Philippa Fairfax. When the play ran she was disappointed by the bad reviews and turned to socialize. During this period she began to see more of Stephen Townsend, whom she had met during the Jubilee year.

In December 1890, Burnett's elder son Lionel died from consumption in Paris, which greatly affected her life and her writing. Before his death, she sought a cure from physicians and took him to Germany to visit spas. After his death, before she sank into a deep depression, she wrote in a letter to a friend that her writing was insignificant in comparison to having been the mother of two boys, one of whom died. At this time she turned away from her traditional faith in the Church of England and embraced Spiritualism and Christian Science.  She returned to London, where she sought the distraction of charity work and formed the Drury Lane Boys' Club, hosting an opening in February 1892. Also during this period, she wrote a play with a starring role for Stephen Townsend in an attempt to begin his acting career. After a two-year absence from her Washington, D.C. home, her husband, and her younger son, Burnett returned there in March 1892, where she continued charity work and began writing again.  In 1893, Burnett published an autobiography, devoted to her elder son, titled The One I Knew Best of All. Also in that year, she had a set of her books displayed at the Chicago World Fair.

Divorce and move to Great Maytham Hall 

Burnett returned to London in 1894; there she heard the news that her younger son Vivian was ill, so she quickly went back to the United States. Vivian recovered from his illness, but missed his first term at Harvard University. Burnett stayed with him until he was well, then returned to London. At this time she began to worry about her finances: she was paying for Vivian's education; keeping a house in Washington D.C. (Swan had moved out of the house to his own apartment); and keeping a home in London. As she had in the past, she turned to writing as a source of income and began to write A Lady of Quality. A Lady of Quality, published in 1896, was to become the first of a series of successful adult historical novels, which was followed in 1899 with In Connection with the De Willoughby Claim; and in 1901 she had published The Making of a Marchioness and The Methods of Lady Walderhurst.

In 1898, when Vivian graduated from Harvard, she divorced Swan Burnett. Officially the cause for the divorce was given to be desertion, but actually, Burnett and Swan had orchestrated the dissolution of their marriage some years earlier. Swan took his own apartment and ceased to live with Burnett so that after a period of two years she could plead desertion as a reason for the divorce. The press was critical, calling her a New Woman, with The Washington Post writing that the divorce resulted from Burnett's "advanced ideas regarding the duties of a wife and the rights of women".

From the mid-1890s she lived in England at Great Maytham Hall—which had a large garden where she indulged her love for flowers—where she made her home for the next decade, although she continued annual transatlantic trips to the United States.  Maytham Hall resembled a feudal manor house which enchanted Burnett. She socialized in the local villages and enjoyed the country life. She filled the house with guests and had Stephen Townsend move in with her, which the local vicar considered a scandal. In February 1900 she married Townsend.

Remarriage and later life 

The marriage took place in Genoa, Italy, and the couple went to Pegli for their honeymoon, where they endured two weeks of steady rain. Burnett's biographer Gretchen Gerzina writes of the marriage, "it was the biggest mistake of her life". The press stressed the age difference—Townsend was ten years younger than she—and she referred to him as her secretary. Biographer Ann Thwaite doubts he loved her. She claims at that time the 50-year-old Burnett was "stout, rouged and unhealthy". Thwaite believes Townsend needed her to help with his acting career and to support him financially. Within months, in a letter to her sister, she admitted the marriage was in trouble. She described Townsend as scarcely sane and hysterical. Thwaite argues Townsend blackmailed her into the marriage: he wanted money from her and he wanted to control her as a husband.

Unable to bear the thought of continuing to live with Townsend at Maytham, Burnett rented a house in London for the winter of 1900–1901. There she socialized with friends and wrote. She worked on two books simultaneously: The Shuttle, a longer and more complicated book; and The Making of a Marchioness, which she wrote in a few weeks and published to good reviews. In the spring of 1901, when she returned to the country, Townsend tried to replace her long-time publisher Scribner's with a publishing house offering a larger advance. In the autumn of 1902, after a summer of socializing and filling Maytham with house-guests, she suffered a physical collapse. She returned to America, and in the winter of 1902 entered a sanatorium. There she told Townsend she would no longer live with him, and the marriage ended.

She returned to Maytham two years later in June 1904.  Maytham Hall had a series of walled gardens and in the rose garden she wrote several books; it was there she had the idea for The Secret Garden, mainly written at the manor house in Buile Hill Park while visiting Manchester. In 1905 A  Little Princess was published, after she had reworked the play into a novel. Once again Burnett turned to writing to increase her income. She lived an extravagant lifestyle, spending money on expensive clothing. It was reported in 1905 that Burnett was a semi-vegetarian. She had eliminated meat almost entirely from her diet.

In 1907, she returned permanently to the United States, having become a citizen in 1905, and built a home, completed in 1908, in the Plandome Park section of Plandome Manor on Long Island outside New York City. Her son Vivian was employed in the publishing business, and at his request, she agreed to be an editor for Children's Magazine. Over the next several years she had published in Children's Magazine several shorter works. In 1911 she had The Secret Garden published. In her later years she maintained the summer home on Long Island, and a winter home in Bermuda. The Lost Prince was published in 1915, and The Head of the House of Coombe and its sequel, Robin, were published in 1922.

Burnett lived for the last 17 years of her life in Plandome Manor, where she died on 29 October 1924, aged 74. She was buried in Roslyn Cemetery.

Reception 
During the serialization of Little Lord Fauntleroy in St. Nicholas in 1885, readers looked forward to new installments. The fashions in the book became popular, with velvet Fauntleroy suits being sold; other Fauntleroy merchandise included velvet collars, playing cards, and chocolates. Sentimental fiction was then the norm, and "rags to riches" stories were popular in the United States; in time, however, Little Lord Fauntleroy lost the popularity that The Secret Garden has retained.

Several of Burnett's novels for adults were also very popular in their day, according to the Publishers Weekly list of bestselling novels in the United States. A Lady of Quality was second in 1896, The Shuttle was fourth in 1907 and fifth in 1908, T. Tembarom was tenth in 1913 and sixth in 1914, and The Head of the House of Coombe was fourth in 1922.

Selected works 

Source:

 That Lass o' Lowrie's (1877)
 Surly Tim (1877)
 Theo: A Sprightly Love Story (1877)
 Lindsay's Luck (1878)
 Haworth's (1879)
 Miss Crespigny  (1879)
 Louisiana (1880)
 A Fair Barbarian (1881)
 Esmerelda (1881), with William Gillette
 Through One Administration (1883)
 Little Lord Fauntleroy (1886)
 Editha's Burglar: A Story for Children (1888)
 The Fortunes of Philippa Fairfax (1888)
 The Pretty Sister of José (1889)
 The Drury Lane Boys' Club (1892)
 The One I Knew the Best of All: A Memory of the Mind of a Child (1893)
 Little Saint Elizabeth, and Other Stories (1893)
 Two Little Pilgrims' Progress. A Story of the City Beautiful (1895)
 A Lady of Quality (1896)
 In Connection with the De Willoughby Claim (1899)
 The Making of a Marchioness (1901), reprinted by Persephone Books
 The Land of the Blue Flower (1904)
 A Little Princess: Being the Whole Story of Sara Crewe Now Told for the First Time (1905)
 Queen Silver-Bell (1906)
 Racketty-Packetty House (1906)
 The Shuttle (1907), reprinted by Persephone Books in 2007
 The Good Wolf (1908)
 The Secret Garden (1911)
 My Robin (1912)
 T. Tembarom (1913)
 The Lost Prince (1915)
 The Little Hunchback Zia (1916)
 The White People (1917)
 The Head of the House of Coombe (1922)
 Robin (1922) – sequel to The Head of the House of Coombe

Citations

Explanatory notes

General sources

External links 

 Complete Works of Frances Hodgson Burnett including articles and short stories
 
 
 
 
 
 Little Lord Fauntleroy:  Frances Hodgson Burnett 

American children's writers
American women novelists
1849 births
1924 deaths
19th-century American novelists
19th-century English novelists
English children's writers
English women novelists
English emigrants to the United States
People from Knoxville, Tennessee
People from Plandome Manor, New York
People from Cheetham Hill
Writers from Manchester
People from Rolvenden
English women dramatists and playwrights
19th-century English women writers
19th-century English dramatists and playwrights
20th-century American novelists
20th-century English novelists
20th-century English dramatists and playwrights
American women children's writers
People from New Market, Tennessee
20th-century English women writers
English Christian Scientists
American Christian Scientists
Converts to Christian Science from Anglicanism
People with acquired American citizenship
20th-century American women writers
American salon-holders
American fantasy writers
English fantasy writers